The 1955 Orpington by-election was a parliamentary by-election held on 20 January 1955 for the British House of Commons constituency of Orpington in Kent, England. It followed the death of the incumbent Conservative Member of Parliament (MP) Sir Waldron Smithers. The seat was held by the Conservatives.

The by-election was notable in that Sumner as the incumbent chairman of the divisional Conservative Association defeated Margaret Thatcher to be adopted prospective candidate for the local constituency. The Liberal Party announced that it would not contest the by-election.

Result

References

Orpington by-election
Orpington by-election
Orpington,1955
Elections in the London Borough of Bromley
Orpington,1955
1950s in Kent
Orpington
Orpington by-election